Frédéric Bednarz is a Canadian violinist. He received the Prix d'Europe in 1996. Bednarz was also a top prize laureate at international competitions in Italy.

Early life and education

Bednarz studied with Oleh Krysa at the Eastman School of Music, Sergiu Schwartz at the Harid Conservatory and Victor Tretiakov in France.

Career

Frédéric Bednarz is active as a soloist and chamber musician. His wide range of repertoire and his sensitive and keen musicianship have been praised by critics. As a soloist, he has played with l'Orchestre Métropolitain de Montreal, the Montreal Chamber Orchestra, the Montreal Youth Symphony Orchestra, La Sinfonia de Montréal, the Ottawa Chamber Orchestra, Ensemble America in New York, the Atlantic Symphony (MA).  As a chamber musician, he performed with Anthony Marwood, Richard Lester, Julius Baker, Malcom Lowe, Alexandre Tharaud. He has premiered many new works by composers, such as R. Murray Schafer, Ana Sokolovic, Claude Marc Bourget. Bednarz has recorded for the XXI, Albany, Radio Canada, ATMA Classique, and Metis-Islands labels. He was a member of the Molinari String Quartet (2007-2018).

Selective Discography

Alfred Schnittke: String Quartets 1-4, Molinari Quartet, Atma Classique 2011
Alfred Schnittke: String Trio, Quartet and Quintet with Piano, Atma Classique 2013
Murray Schafer: Quartets 8-12, Molinari Quartet, Atma Classique 2013
Shostakovich and Szymanowski: violin and piano sonatas, Natsuki Hiratsuka piano, Metis-Island 2014.
Lekeu/Franck/Boulanger: violin and piano sonatas, Natsuki Hiratsuka piano, Metis-Island 2015.
Sofia Gubaidulina: Rejoice, Sonata for violin and cello, String Quartets 1-4, Molinari Quartet, Atma Classique 2015
Petros Shoujounian: Noravank: String Quartets 3-6, Molinari Quartet, ATMA Classique 2016
György Kurtág: Complete String Quartets, Molinari Quartet, Atma Classique 2016
Giya Kancheli: Sunny Night, Natsuki Hiratsuka, piano, Jonathan Goldman, bandoneon, Metis-Island 2019

References

External links

Living people
Canadian classical violinists
Canadian male violinists and fiddlers
Musicians from Montreal
Eastman School of Music alumni
1974 births
21st-century Canadian violinists and fiddlers
21st-century Canadian male musicians